Frechinia laetalis is a moth in the family Crambidae. It was described by William Barnes and James Halliday McDunnough in 1914. It is found in North America, where it has been recorded from eastern Washington and Oregon to Utah, southern California and western Texas.

The length of the forewings is 4.5–6 mm. The forewings are white with yellowish-brown patches and gray scales. The postmedial line is white and there is a brownish-gray patch inside this line, containing white scales along the veins. The hindwings are white in males and dark gray in females. Adults have been recorded on wing from March to October.

The larvae feed on Ambrosia species. They mine the leaves of their host plant.

References

Moths described in 1914
Odontiini